Sabrina Jeffries (born 1958) is American author of romance novels, who also writes under the pen names Deborah Martin and Deborah Nicholas. Entertainment Weekly calls her "one of the long-reigning leading voices in historical romance."

Early life
When Jeffries was seven years old, her parents became missionaries and moved the family to Thailand where they lived for eleven years. She began making up her own stories when she was twelve.

Jeffries earned a Ph.D. in English, writing her dissertation on James Joyce.

Career 
While serving as a visiting assistant professor of English at Tulane University, Jeffries attempted to develop an academic work from her dissertation. Bored with this attempt, she began writing a romance novel instead.

After realizing that she enjoyed writing more than teaching, Jeffries left the academic world to work as a technical writer, while writing novels at night. Although her first attempt did not sell, after ten rejections Jeffries's second book was finally picked up by Leisure.

She has published historical romances as both Sabrina Jeffries and Deborah Martin, and contemporary paranormal romantic suspense as Deborah Nicholas.

Her novels Beware a Scot's Revenge and Let Sleeping Rogues Lie became New York Times Bestsellers.

Awards 

 HOLT Best Long Historical, Virginia Romance Writers for The Dangerous Lord  (2000)
 Maggie Award for Best Historical Romance for The Dangerous Lord  (2000)
 Colorado Romance Writer’s Award of Excellence for Best Historical Romance for A Notorious Love (2001)
 HOLT Medallion Contest for Best Short Historical, Virginia Romance Writers for In the Prince’s Bed  (2004)
 Gayle Wilson Award of Excellence for Best Historical Fiction for To Pleasure a Prince (2005)
 Best Historical K.I.S.S. Hero Award from RT Book Reviews for To Pleasure a Prince (2005)
 More than Magic award for Best Historical for One Night with a Prince  (2005)
 More than Magic award for Best Historical for Never Seduce a Scoundrel (2006)
 Winter Rose Award for Excellence in Romantic Fiction for Never Seduce a Scoundrel (2006) 
 Maggie Award Winner for Best Historical for Only a Duke Will Do (2006)
 K.I.S.S. Award Winner from RT Book Reviews for Don’t Bargain with the Devil (2009)
 Career Achievement Award Winner, RT Book Reviews (2009)
 HOLT Medallion Award of Merit, Virginia Romance Writers for The Truth About Lord Stoneville (2010)
 K.I.S.S. Award Winner from RT Book Reviews for To Wed A Wild Lord (2011)
 K.I.S.S. Award Winner from RT Book Reviews for How the Scoundrel Seduces (2014)

Personal life 
Jeffries lives in Cary, North Carolina with her husband and son Nick.

Publications

Novels and novellas

Lord Trilogy 
The Pirate Lord (Avon, 1998) 
The Forbidden Lord (Avon, 1999) 
The Dangerous Lord (Avon, 2000)

Swanlea Spinsters 
A Dangerous Love (Avon, 2000) 
A Notorious Love (Avon, 2001) 
After the Abduction (Avon, 2002) 
Dance of Seduction (Avon, 2003) 
Married to the Viscount (Avon, 2004)

The Royal Brotherhood 
In the Prince's Bed (Pocket Star, 2004) 
To Pleasure a Prince (Pocket Star, 2005) 
One Night With a Prince (Pocket Star, 2005)

School for Heiresses 
 Never Seduce a Scoundrel (Pocket Books, 2006) 
 Only a Duke Will Do (Pocket Books, 2006) 
 The School for Heiresses. with Renee Bernard, Liz Carlye, Julia London, and Julia London. (Pocket Star, 2006) 
 Ten Reasons to Stay (Pocket, 2006) 
 Beware a Scot's Revenge (Pocket Books, 2007) 
 Snowy Night with a Stranger. with Jane Feather and Julia London. (Pocket Star, 2008) 
 When Sparks Fly (Pocket Books 2008) 
 Let Sleeping Rogues Lie (Pocket Books, 2008) 
 Don't Bargain with the Devil (Pocket Books, 2009) 
 Wed Him Before You Bed Him (Pocket Books 2009)

Hellions of Halstead Hall 
 The Truth about Lord Stoneville (Pocket Books, 2009) 
 A Hellion in her Bed (Pocket Star, 2010) 
 How to Woo a Reluctant Lady (Pocket Star, 2011) 
 To Wed a Wild Lord (Pocket Star, 2011) ISBN 9781451642407
 A Lady Never Surrenders (Pocket Books, 2012) 
 'Twas the Night after Christmas (Gallery Books, 2012)

The Duke's Men 
 What the Duke Desires (Pocket Books, 2013) 
 When the Rogue Returns (Pocket Books, 2014) 
 Dorinda and the Doctor (Pocket Star, 2014) 
 How the Scoundrel Seduces (Pocket Books, 2014) 
 If the Viscount Falls (Pocket Books, 2015)

Sinful Suitors 
 The Art of Sinning (Pocket Books, 2015) 
 The Heiress and the Hothead (Pocket Star 2016) 
 What Happens Under the Mistletoe. with Karen Hawkins, Candace Camp, and Meredith Duran (Pocket Books, 2016) 
 A Study of Seduction (Pocket Books, 2016) 
 The Danger of Desire (Pocket Books, 2016) 
 The Pleasures of Passion (Pocket Books, 2017) 
 A Talent for Temptation (Pocket Star, 2017) 
 The Secret of Flirting (Pocket Books, 2018) 
 The Risk of Rogues (Pocket Star, 2018)

Duke Dynasty 
 Project Duchess (Zebra, 2019) 
 Seduction on a Snowy Night with Mary Putney and Madeline Hunter (Kensington, 2019) 
 The Bachelor (Zebra, 2020) 
 Who Wants to Marry a Duke (Zebra, 2020) 
 Undercover Duke (Zebra, 2021) 
 A Yuletide Kiss, with Madeline Hunter and Mary Jo Putney (Kensington, 2021)

Designing Debutantes 

 A Duke for Diana (Zebra, 2022) ISBN 978-1-4201-5377-4

Short fiction 
 The French Maid (Pocket Books, 2012) 
 Closer Than They Appear (BelleBooks, 2014) 
 Gone but not Forgotten (BelleBooks, 2014)

Included in anthologies and collections 
 One Night with a Rogue (St. Martin's Paperbacks,1995) 
 A Dance with the Devil (St. Martin's Press1997) 
 "The Widow's Auction." in Fantasy (Penguin, 2006) 
 At Home in Mossy Creek (BelleBooks, 2007) 
 "An April Fool's Forbidden Affair," Premiere: A Romance Writers of America® Collection (Romance Writers of America, 2014)

As Deborah Martin

Novels
Moonlight Enchantment (Leisure Books, 1992) 
Creole Nights (Leisure Books, 1992) 
Dangerous Angel (Topaz, 1994) 
Creole Bride (Topaz, 1997)

Restoration 
 By Love Unveiled (Topaz, 1993) 
 Silver Deceptions (Topaz, 1994)

Wales 
 Windswept (Topaz, 1995) 
 Stormswept (Topaz, 1996)

As Deborah Nicholas

Novels 
Night Vision (Dell, 1993) 
Silent Sonata (Dell, 1994) 
Shattered Reflections (Zebra, 1996)

References

Living people
20th-century American novelists
21st-century American novelists
American romantic fiction writers
Novelists from North Carolina
People from Cary, North Carolina
American women novelists
Women romantic fiction writers
20th-century American women writers
21st-century American women writers
20th-century pseudonymous writers
21st-century pseudonymous writers
Pseudonymous women writers
Tulane University faculty
1958 births